Robert Morgan Robson (November 28, 1921 – September 5, 2006) was an American attorney and politician who was the 25th attorney general of Idaho, from 1969 to 1971.

Early life and education 
Robson was born and raised in Kellogg, Idaho. After graduating from its high school, he studied pre-med at the University of Idaho in Moscow. He later earned a law degree from the UI College of Law.

Career 
Robson joined the United States Navy in 1941 and was assigned to the Naval Air Training Command. After graduating from law school, he served as district attorney for the Trust Territory of the Pacific Islands. He also held positions in the Idaho Republican Party, including state finance chair and member of the executive committee.

He served as Idaho's 25th attorney general from 1969 to 1971, appointed by Governor Don Samuelson following the election of predecessor Allan Shepard to the Idaho Supreme Court. In 1970, Robson argued on behalf of Idaho in Oregon v. Mitchell; later that year in the November election, he was defeated by Democrat Tony Park.

After leaving office in 1971, he practiced law in Boise and Phoenix, Arizona.

Personal life 
Robson and his wife, Catherine Penelope Agee, were married from 1944 until his death in 2006. They had four children and lived in Hayden, Idaho.

References 

1921 births
2006 deaths
Idaho Republicans
Idaho Attorneys General
People from Kellogg, Idaho
University of Idaho College of Law alumni
People from Hayden, Idaho
United States Navy personnel of World War II